The 2023 IMSA VP Racing SportsCar Challenge is the inaugural season of the IMSA VP Racing SportsCar Challenge. The races will be contested with LMP3-spec and GT4-spec cars. The season began on January 20 at Daytona International Speedway and will conclude on October 14 at Road Atlanta.

Calendar
The provisional 2023 calendar was released on August 5, 2022, at IMSA's annual State of the Sport Address, featuring twelve rounds split across six race weekends. Five of the six events had confirmed dates. The final calendar was confirmed on August 26, 2022, adding rounds at Daytona and Lime Rock Park while dropping the round at WeatherTech Raceway Laguna Seca.

Entry list

LMP3

GSX

Race results 
Bold indicates overall winner.

Championship standings

Points system
Championship points are awarded in each class at the finish of each event. Points are awarded based on finishing positions in the race as shown in the chart below.

LMP3 Driver's Championship

GSX Driver's Championship

†: Post-event penalty. Car moved to back of class.

LMP3 Bronze Drivers Cup

GSX Bronze Drivers Cup

LMP3 Team's Championship

GSX Team's Championship

†: Post-event penalty. Car moved to back of class.

GSX Manufacturer's Championship

Notes

References

IMSA VP Racing SportsCar Challenge
IMSA VP Racing SportsCar Challenge
IMSA VP Racing SportsCar Challenge